The Whites Drug Store Classic (known as the Westwood Inn Classic in 2015) was an annual bonspiel, or curling tournament, that took place at the Swan River Curling Club in Swan River, Manitoba. The tournament was held in a triple-knockout format. The tournament, started in 1998, was part of the World Curling Tour and has been held every year since its inception until 2015.

Past champions
Only skip's name is displayed.

References

External links
Home Page
Swan River Curling Club Home

Former World Curling Tour events
Curling in Manitoba